The Green Party of Quebec ran eighty candidates in the 2008 provincial election, none of whom were elected. Information about these candidates may be found on this page.

Candidates

Brome-Missisquoi: Louise Martineau
Louise Martineau has a Bachelor of Arts degree in politics and international relations and a Master of Arts degree in philosophy, both from the Université de Sherbrooke. She joined the Green Party in 2004 and has been a party candidate at both the federal and provincial levels. Her website features a political/poetic manifesto entitled La Flamme Sacrée du Québec.

Martineau sought the leadership of the Quebec Green Party in November 2010. She finished third against Claude Sabourin.

Chapleau: Roger Fleury
Roger J. Fleury has Bachelor of Arts, Bachelor of Social Science, and Master of Education degrees from the University of Ottawa, and is a retired teacher of history and economics. He served on the board of the Pavillon du Parc, a centre for severely disabled children located in Aylmer, until its administration was taken over by the Quebec government in the 1990s; one of Fleury's own children is severely disabled.

He has been a Green Party candidate in two elections and also ran for mayor of Gatineau in 2009. Sixty-six years old during the municipal campaign, he was president of the Coalition for Rapid Transit in the Outaouais and called for a light rail network to replace the city's planned Rapibus transitway. He also proposed a new Gatineau city square that would combine a football stadium, soccer pitch, and amphitheatre.

Orford: Louis Hamel
Louis Hamel is a businessperson who served on the city council of Deauville before it was amalgamated into Sherbrooke. He has been a Green Party candidate in two provincial elections. In the 2007 election, he spoke against the provincial government's sale of a part of the Mont-Orford National Park. He was forty-eight years old in 2008.

Richelieu: Patrick Lamothe
Patrick Lamothe was born and raised in Sorel-Tracy, Quebec. He was twenty-two years old at the time of the election and was completing a Bachelor's Degree in teaching secondary social studies at the Université du Québec à Montréal. He called for measures that would stop the exodus of young people from the Sorel-Tracy area. He received 693 votes (2.81%), finishing fifth against Parti Québécois incumbent Sylvain Simard.

References

2008